The Arbitration Act 1950 (c.27, 14 Geo. 6) was an Act of the Parliament of the United Kingdom that consolidated and amended arbitration law in England and Wales.

Although the Act has now largely been superseded by the Arbitration Act 1996, Part II of the Act (dealing with the enforcement of non-New York Convention awards) remains in force.  This is principally to preserve the enforcement mechanism for awards made under the (now largely obsolete) Geneva Protocol (1924).

The main purpose of the Act was to consolidate and rationalise the prior statutes regulating arbitration.  However the 1950 Act became increasingly subject to criticism because of the power of the courts to review arbitration awards under section 21.  That section required the arbitration tribunal to make a "statement of case" on any matter of law which was reviewable by the court.  This was unpopular and led to loss of arbitration business in the United Kingdom, and led to the repeal of the provisions under the Arbitration Act 1979.

References

United Kingdom Acts of Parliament 1950
Arbitration law